Jon Paul Piques (born June 30, 1986), also known simply as Piques, is a Canadian actor, director, internet celebrity and former soccer player. He has over 3 billion views on YouTube and over 11 million combined followers.

Career

Soccer career 
Piques played as a goalkeeper during his youth and was scouted by Sporting CP through his father's contacts at the Lisbon club. Sporting's officials wanted him to stay, but he was unable to as he was still in ninth grade. He finished up his school year and joined Sporting's academy. During his time there, he became close friends with Miguel Veloso, and although they never played together, Cristiano Ronaldo. Piques was at Sporting for ten months, and FIFA rules determined that he had to return to Canada. He went back to Portugal after turning eighteen, to play for Beja and then for Braga's reserve team, before returning to Canada to play one season with the Montreal Impact. At Braga B, he was second-choice to Eduardo and was a teammate of Diego Costa, both of whom would later play for Chelsea, Piques' favourite club.

In 2007, he played with Montreal's reserve team Trois-Rivières Attak in the Canadian Soccer League, where he won the Open Canada Cup. The following season, he played with division rivals the Italia Shooters, where he won the International Division title.

Media career 
Piques decided to change career paths and attended Humber College, majoring in marketing and sales. After college, Piques worked as a business insurance salesman, but later moved to Los Angeles following initial success on social media. Piques' breakthrough on social media was through Vine, where he posted comedic videos on his way back and forth to his insurance job. Following his success on Vine, Piques expanded into Facebook where he is, as of May 2016, in the top 10 content creators. Many of Piques’ social media videos involve collaborations with other Vine stars such as Jerry Purpdrank, Amanda Cerny, Lele Pons, Max Jr and King Bach.

Piques was a featured speaker in the 2016 SXSW festival in Austin, Texas, where he led the panel about the rise of social media in today's world.

Piques shot his first pilot presentation in May 2016, which he wrote and is starring in for Playboy Digital. In 2018, Piques had a voice role in a six-part animated series Super Slackers, directed by Simpsons director David Silverman. In 2019, he appeared in Airplane Mode, a film featuring several internet celebrities and co-written by the Paul brothers.

Some of the brands Piques has worked with include T-Mobile, Anheuser-Busch and TGI Fridays among others.

Personal life 
Piques was raised in Woodbridge, Ontario, Canada. He is of Italian and Portuguese descent.

References 

1986 births
Living people
People from Vaughan
Soccer people from Ontario
Canadian people of Italian descent
Canadian people of Portuguese descent
Canadian Internet celebrities
Canadian soccer players
Canadian expatriate soccer players
Canadian expatriate sportspeople in Portugal
Expatriate footballers in Portugal
S.C. Braga B players
Humber College alumni
Association football goalkeepers
Canadian Soccer League (1998–present) players
Trois-Rivières Attak players
York Region Shooters players
USL First Division players
Montreal Impact (1992–2011) players